Max Meyer was an Italian professional cycling team that existed from 1967 to 1969.

Major wins

1967
 Giro del Veneto, Luciano Galbo
1968
 Overall  Tirreno–Adriatico, Claudio Michelotto
 Coppa Agostoni, Claudio Michelotto
 Gran Premio Industria e Commercio di Prato, Adriano Durante
1969
 Overall  Giro di Sardegna, Claudio Michelotto
 Milano–Torino, Claudio Michelotto
 Trofeo Laigueglia, Claudio Michelotto

References

External links

Defunct cycling teams based in Italy
1967 establishments in Italy
1969 disestablishments in Italy
Cycling teams established in 1967
Cycling teams disestablished in 1969